Sasakia charonda, the Japanese emperor or great purple emperor, is a species of butterfly in the family Nymphalidae. It is native to Japan (from Hokkaidō to Kyūshū), the Korean Peninsula, China, northern Taiwan and northern Vietnam. They are common in the upper canopies of forests, only coming down to feed or to find salt sources. The larvae of the species feed on hackberries, like Celtis jessoensis, Celtis japonica and Celtis sinensis.

See also
List of butterflies of Taiwan

References

External links

Apaturinae
National symbols of Japan
Butterflies of Asia
Butterflies described in 1863
Taxa named by William Chapman Hewitson
Butterflies of Japan
Butterflies of Indochina
Insects of Korea
Lepidoptera of Taiwan